Troy is a male given first name used in English-speaking countries, and may derive from the Irish Troightheach, meaning "foot soldier". Troy can also be a short form of the female name Geertruida in Dutch. Additionally Troy is utilised as an anglicised surname derived from a variety of Gaelic and Norman surnames. Further detail here Troy (surname).

Alternately, especially as a modern given name for boys, the name may be of Classical Greek inspiration—derived from the ancient city of Troy, site of the legendary Trojan War described in the Epic Cycle of Ancient Greece, most famously in Homer's epic poems the Iliad and the Odyssey.

People

Male

Troy Andersen (born 1999), American football player
Troy Aikman (born 1966), American football player
Troy Apke (born 1995), American football player
Troy Baker (born 1976), American voice actor
Troy Baxter Jr. (born 1996), American basketball player
Troy Bayliss (born 1969), Australian motorcycle racer
Troy Brouwer (born 1985), Canadian ice hockey player
Troy Brown (born 1971), American football player
Troy Calhoun (born 1966), American football coach
Troy Daniels (born 1991), American basketball player
Troy Denning (born 1958), American author
Troy Donahue (1936–2001), American actor and singer
Troy Donockley (born 1964), British composer
Troy Dorsey (born 1962), American boxer and kickboxer
Troy Duffy (born 1971), American director
Troy Dye (born 1996), American football player
Troy Eid (born 1963), American lawyer
Troy Flavell (born 1976), New Zealand rugby player
Troy Fumagalli (born 1995), American football player
Troy Gentry (1967–2017), American country music singer, one half of the duo Montgomery Gentry
Troy Glaus (born 1976), American baseball player
Troy Grant (born 1970), Australian politician
Troy Leon Gregg (1948–1980), American fugitive
Troy Grosenick (born 1989), American ice hockey player
Troy Hairston (born 1998), American football player
Troy Hartman (born 1971), American stunt performer
Troy Hudson (born 1976), American basketball player
Troy King (born 1968), American politician
Troy Ladd (born 1969), American car designer
Troy Kennedy Martin (1932–2009), British screenwriter
Troy McLawhorn (born 1969), American musician
Troy Murphy (born 1980), American basketball player
Troy Neiman (born 1990), American baseball player
Troy O'Leary (born 1969), American baseball player
Troy Parrott (born 2002), Irish soccer player
Troy Pelshak (born 1977), American football player
Troy Percival (born 1969), American baseball player
Troy Perkins (born 1981), American soccer player 
Troy Perry (born 1940), American church founder
Troy Polamalu (born 1981), American football player
Troy Pride (born 1998), American football player
Troy Reeder (born 1994), American football player
Troy Sanders (born 1973), American singer and bassist
Troy Shondell (1939–2016), American singer
Troye Sivan (born 1995), Australian singer-songwriter
Troy Smith (born 1984), American football player
Troy Stoudermire (born 1990), American football player
Troy Tanner (born 1963), American volleyball player
Troy Tulowitzki (born 1984), American baseball player 
Troy Turner (born 1961), American entrepreneur
Troy Van Leeuwen (born 1970), American musician
Troy Vincent (born 1970), American football player
Troy White (born 1955), American, Aviation Artist, Historian, Author.

Female
Troy Beyer (born 1964), American author
Troy Mullins (born 1987), American World Long Driver competitor

Fictional characters
 Troy, a customer played by Jordan Williams in the British web series Corner Shop Show
Troy Barnes, fictional character in the television series Community
Troy Bolton, fictional character in the High School Musical films
Troy Dyer, a fictional character in the film Reality Bites
Troy McClure, fictional character in the television series The Simpsons
Troy Tatterton, fictional character in the Casteel series of books
Troy Burrows, fictional character in the television series Power Rangers Megaforce and Power Rangers Super Megaforce
Troy, fictional character in the video game Dying Light
Troy Carmichael, a young girl character in the film Crooklyn, played by Zelda Harris
Troy Walsh, a bully in the Netflix TV Series Stranger Things

See also
Troy (surname)
Troy (disambiguation)

References

English masculine given names
Masculine given names